is a Japanese professional shogi player ranked 9-dan. He is the 17th Lifetime Meijin and also a former president of the Japan Shogi Association (JSA).

Early life
Kōji Tanigawa was born in Kobe on April 6, 1962. He entered the Japan Shogi Association's apprentice school at the rank of 5-kyū in 1973 under the tutelage of shogi professional , was promoted to the rank of 1-dan in 1975, and was officially awarded professional status and the rank of 4-dan in 1976 at the age of fourteen, thus becoming the second person to obtain professional status while still a junior high school student.

Shogi professional

Tanigawa's first major title match appearance came in 1983 when he challenged Hifumi Katō for the 41st Meijin title. Tanigawa won the match 4 games to 2 to not only win his first major title, but also to become the youngest player to ever win the Meijin title at the age of 21. The following year, he successfully defended his title by defeating  4 games to 1 in the 42nd Meijin title match; he was however, unable to defend his title once again title in 1985, losing the 43rd Meijin title match to Makoto Nakahara 4 games to 2.

On March 10, 2011, Tanigawa became the 4th shogi professional to win 1200 official games when he defeated Daisuke Nakagawa.Tanigawa's age of 48 years and 11 months made him at that time the youngest player to achieve such a result.

On October 1, 2018, Tanigawa became the fifth shogi professional to win 1300 official games.

Promotion history 
The promotion history of Tanigawa is as follows:
 5-kyū: 1973
 1-dan: 1975
 4-dan: December 20, 1976
 5-dan: April 1, 1979
 6-dan: April 1, 1980
 7-dan: April 1, 1981
 8-dan: April 1, 1982
 9-dan: April 1, 1984

Titles and other championships
Tanigawa has appeared in major title matches a total of 57 times and has won 27 major titles. He has won the Meijin title 5 times, thus qualifying for the Lifetime Meijin title. In addition to major titles, Tanigawa has won 22 other shogi championships during his career.

Major titles

Other championships

Note: Tournaments marked with an asterisk (*) are no longer held.

Awards and honors
Tanigawa has received a number of awards and honors throughout his career for his accomplishments both on an off the shogi board. These include the Annual Shogi Awards given out by the JSA for performance in official games as well as other JSA awards for career accomplishments, and awards received from governmental organizations, etc. for contributions made to Japanese society.

Annual Shogi Awards
6th Annual Awards (April 1978March 1979): Best New Player
7th Annual Awards (April 1979March 1980): Technique Award
9th Annual Awards (April 1981March 1982): Technique Award
10th Annual Awards (April 1982March 1983): Distinguished Service Award
11th Annual Awards (April 1983March 1984): Special Award
13th Annual Awards (April 1985March 1986): Player of the Year, Most Games Won, Most Games Played
14th Annual Awards (April 1986March 1987): Most Games Won, Most Games Played
15th Annual Awards (April 1987March 1988): Player of the Year
18th Annual Awards (April 1990March 1991): Player of the Year
19th Annual Awards (April 1991March 1992): Player of the Year
22nd Annual Awards (April 1994March 1995): Special Award
24th Annual Awards (April 1996March 1997): Most Games Played
25th Annual Awards (April 1997March 1998): Player of the Year
26th Annual Awards (April 1998March 1999): Most Games Played
27th Annual Awards (April 1999March 2000): Most Games Played
30th Annual Awards (April 2002March 2003): Special Award
31st Annual Awards (April 2003March 2004): Masuda Award
34th Annual Awards (April 2006March 2007): Game of the Year

Other awards
1983, September: Kobe City Culture Special Award
1988: Kobe City Special Award
1989: Kobe City Government Meritorius Citizen Award
1991: Shogi Honor Fighting-spirit Award (Awarded by JSA in recognition of winning 600 official games as a professional)
1992: Kobe City Special Award
1997, June: Hyōgo Prefecture Honor Award, Kobe City Culture Honor Award
2001: 25 Years Service Award (Awarded by the JSA in recognition of being an active professional for twenty-five years)
2002: Kobe City Special Award, Special Shogi Honor Award (Awarded by JSA in recognition of winning 1000 official games as a professional)
2007: Hyogo Prefecture Culture Award
2014: Japanese Government's Medal of Honor with Purple Ribbons

Year-end prize money and game fee ranking
Tanigawa has finished in the "Top 10" of the JSA's  each year from 1993 to 2007, and then again in 2013. He also has finished in the "Top 3" eight times, and was the top money winner in 1997.

Note: All amounts are given in Japanese yen and include prize money and fees earned from official tournaments and games held from January 1 to December 31.

JSA executive
Tanigawa was selected to be a senior managing director of Japan Shogi Association for a two-year term at the association's 62nd General Meeting on May 26, 2011. On December 18, 2012, JSA president Kunio Yonenaga died, and Tanigawa was subsequently selected to be his replacement at a special JSA members meeting held on December 25, 2012. This made him the first JSA president from the Kansai region. 

Tanigawa was re-elected as president at the 64th (June 7, 2013) and 66th (June 4, 2015) General Meetings; however, he announced on January 18, 2017, that he had decided to resign in order to accept responsibility for the JSA's handling of the 29th Ryūō challenger controversy. Tanigawa continued to serve as president until his successor was chosen at a special meeting of the JSA membership on February 6, 2017.

Video games
In the late 1980s, Pony Canyon released a line of Shogi video games for the MSX and Famicom featuring Tanigawa. The series was titled .

Notes

References

External links
 ShogiHub: Professional Player Info · Tanigawa, Koji
 City of Kobe 日本人の応援団: 谷川浩司氏
 tanigawa17.life.coocan.jp

1962 births
Japanese shogi players
Living people
Professional shogi players
Recipients of the Medal with Purple Ribbon
Professional shogi players from Hyōgo Prefecture
Meijin (shogi)
Ryūō
Kisei (shogi)
Ōi (shogi)
Ōza (shogi)
Kiō
Ōshō
Lifetime titles
Recipients of the Kōzō Masuda Award
People from Kobe
People related to Jōdo Shinshū
Ginga
Presidents of the Japan Shogi Association